Wintergreen (1906–1914) was an American Thoroughbred racehorse that is best known for winning the 1909 Kentucky Derby and for being the first horse bred in Ohio to win the Derby. Wintergreen was bred and trained by Jerome "Rome" Respess at his Ohio stud farm. Respess was a multimillionaire owner of a brewing company and also owned Wintergreen's sire, Dick Welles — named after Richard H. Welles, later the father of Orson Welles.

Wintergreen raced from ages two to seven years old but did not win any stakes races before or after the Kentucky Derby but was a stakes performer for most of his career.

Wintergreen was killed April 10, 1914, in a fire that consumed barn #18 at the Latonia Race Track in Covington, Kentucky, just across the Ohio River from Cincinnati. He had been gelded some years previously and was racing for D. Fisk.

Pedigree

References

1906 racehorse births
Racehorses trained in the United States
Racehorses bred in Ohio
Kentucky Derby winners
1914 racehorse deaths
Thoroughbred family 4